WBON-LD is a digital low power television station serving portions of east-central Kentucky, including the Lexington area. Licensed to Richmond with a transmitter near Waco, the station is owned by Wallingford Broadcasting, Inc. The station's digital signal is broadcast on digital VHF channel 9. It shares a broadcast tower with co-owned FM stations WCYO and WLFX.

History 
Originally licensed in East Bernstadt, Kentucky in 1991 as W09BZ, the station began life on November 29, 1993 as an America One affiliate, but also providing programming from the Trinity Broadcasting Network on a secondary basis. For its first 20+ years on the air, the station was owned by Andrea and Joey Kesler, the latter of which was a former WKYH-TV weatherman and sportscaster. The station's callsign was changed to WOBZ-LP in 2000. The station then became affiliated with Urban America Television in 2001, and stayed with that network until that network closed in 2006. It switched to the Retro Television Network as its affiliated network, but also launched a DT2 subchannel to carry Frost Great Outdoors programming. The station's DT3 subchanel aired programming from Luken Communications-owned Tuff TV beginning in the early 2010s, along with Jewelry Television programming during the overnight hours. Upon the station's conversion to digital in 2010, the station's replaced the -LP suffix in their callsign with -LD to become WOBZ-LD.

Tower collapse
On January 29, 2008, the tower used by WOBZ-LP and radio station WJJA-LP collapsed during a storm. The station continued to be seen on London cable and over the internet. Station management hoped to build a new tower by April of that year, which they did.

New affiliation and ownership
In 2016, the station's main digital subchannel became an affiliate of Buzzr, featuring FremantleMedia’s classic game show library. In 2018, the station was sold to its current owner, Wallingford Broadcasting.

Relocation to Richmond
Under new ownership, the station applied with the FCC to relocate its studio and transmission facilities to Richmond in early 2019. It was granted a construction permit in February 2019 to relocate as well as to upgrade its signal power to 3,000 watts. On July 11 of the same year, the station’s callsign changed to the current WBON-LD. The move was completed in April 2020 and the station now operates under full license to cover from Richmond as WBON-LD.

Digital television

Digital channels
The station's digital channel is multiplexed. The station’s subchannel lineup is currently listed as follows:

Locally-based programming
In addition to network programming, WBON-LD currently provides local programming, including KHSAA-sanctioned high school football and basketball games, a daily local newscast called "LIVE at FIVE" along other locally produced & seasonal programming, and some syndicated programming, some of which is compliant of the FCC's children's television programming requirements.

In the 2000s as WOBZ-LP/LD, the station was the southeastern Kentucky home to Ohio Valley Wrestling originating from WBKI-TV in Louisville.

Logos

References

External links
Official homepage

1993 establishments in Kentucky
Buzzr affiliates
Low-power television stations in the United States
Laurel County, Kentucky
Television channels and stations established in 1993
BON-LD
Richmond, Kentucky